Borderlessness may refer to:

 Borderless country, an insular territory over which a nation-state maintains sovereignty under international law, that does not share the land territory of any of its islands – See List of countries and territories by land borders; or
 Borderless selling, the process of selling services to clients outside the country of origin of services while eliminating the actions specifically designed to hinder international trade.

See also
 Without Borders